John G. "Johnny" Menville was an American college football player and physician. He was a quarterback for the Tulane Green Wave football team from 1926 to 1928. Menville was selected All-Southern by some writers in 1927. He won the Porter Cup as his university's best athlete in 1928.

References

Physicians from Louisiana
American football quarterbacks
All-Southern college football players
Tulane Green Wave football players
American football halfbacks